Hapa railway station is a railway station in the city of Jamnagar in Gujarat, India.  It is located in the Western Railway zone of Rajkot Division. Hapa railway station is located in Hapa tehsil of Jamnagar district and lies on the eastern outskirts of Jamnagar. A few express passenger trains originate and terminate at Hapa. Saurashtra Express, Saurashtra Mail and some other trains also halt at Hapa.

Originating trains

References

Railway stations in Jamnagar district
Rajkot railway division
Transport in Jamnagar